Stephen Richard McCullough (born February 15, 1972) is a justice of the Supreme Court of Virginia, former judge of the Court of Appeals of Virginia, and former career attorney in the Office of the Attorney General of Virginia.  On March 10, 2016, the General Assembly of Virginia elected him to a twelve-year term on the Supreme Court, beginning March 3, 2016. His formal investiture occurred on May 23, 2016.

Biography
McCullough graduated from the University of Virginia in 1994 and obtained his law degree from the University of Richmond T.C. Williams School of Law in 1997. After completing law school, he served as a law clerk to state Supreme Court Justice Leroy R. Hassell Sr.

In 1999, McCullough joined the criminal litigation section of the Office of the Attorney General. In 2006, then-Attorney General Robert F. McDonnell promoted him to the position of deputy solicitor general.  He later became Solicitor General of Virginia under then-Attorney General William C. Mims.  He served as opinions counsel and senior appellate counsel under then-Attorney General Kenneth T. Cuccinelli.  On July 29, 2011, the General Assembly elected McCullough to an eight-year term on the Court of Appeals, beginning August 1, 2011.

References

1972 births
Living people
Justices of the Supreme Court of Virginia
University of Virginia alumni
University of Richmond School of Law alumni
Judges of the Court of Appeals of Virginia
21st-century American judges
Solicitors General of Virginia